Paracorrhenes is a genus of beetle in the family Cerambycidae. Its sole species is Paracorrhenes flavomaculata. It was described by Stephan von Breuning in 1978.

References

Pteropliini
Beetles described in 1978